Sisymbrium sylvestre may be:
S. sylvestre L., a synonym of Rorippa sylvestris (L.) Besser
S. sylvestre C.Mohr ex Bab., a synonym of Rorippa palustris (L.) Besser
S. sylvestre Burm. ex DC., a synonym of Sisymbrium lyratum Burm.f.
S. sylvestre Burm.f., a synonym of Diplotaxis tenuifolia (L.) DC.